South Tyneside Council elections are generally held three years out of every four, with a third of the council being elected each time. South Tyneside Council is the local authority for the metropolitan borough of South Tyneside in Tyne and Wear, England. Since the last boundary changes in 2004, 54 councillors are elected, 3 from each of the 18 wards.

Political control
South Tyneside was created under the Local Government Act 1972 as a metropolitan borough, with Tyne and Wear County Council providing county-level services. The first election to the council was held in 1973, initially operating as a shadow authority before coming into its powers on 1 April 1974. Tyne and Wear County Council was abolished in 1986 and South Tyneside became a unitary authority. Political control of the council since 1973 has been held by the following parties:

Leadership
The leaders of the council since 1997 have been:

Council elections
1998 South Tyneside Metropolitan Borough Council election
1999 South Tyneside Metropolitan Borough Council election
2000 South Tyneside Metropolitan Borough Council election
2002 South Tyneside Metropolitan Borough Council election
2003 South Tyneside Metropolitan Borough Council election
2004 South Tyneside Metropolitan Borough Council election (whole council elected after boundary changes which reduced the number of seats by 6)
2006 South Tyneside Metropolitan Borough Council election
2007 South Tyneside Metropolitan Borough Council election
2008 South Tyneside Metropolitan Borough Council election
2010 South Tyneside Metropolitan Borough Council election
2011 South Tyneside Metropolitan Borough Council election
2012 South Tyneside Metropolitan Borough Council election
2014 South Tyneside Metropolitan Borough Council election
2015 South Tyneside Metropolitan Borough Council election
2016 South Tyneside Metropolitan Borough Council election
2018 South Tyneside Metropolitan Borough Council election
2019 South Tyneside Metropolitan Borough Council election
2021 South Tyneside Metropolitan Borough Council election
2022 South Tyneside Metropolitan Borough Council election

Borough result maps

By-election results

1994-1998

1998-2002

2006-2010

2010-2014

2014-2018

2018-2022

References

 By-election results

External links
South Tyneside Metropolitan Borough Council

 
Council elections in Tyne and Wear
Metropolitan Borough of South Tyneside
Metropolitan borough council elections in England